The Hunter 43 Legend is an American sailboat that was designed by the Hunter Design Team as a cruiser and first built in 1989.

The Hunter 43 Legend design was developed into the 1995 Hunter 430 which has a similar hull, but different interior arrangement.

Production
The design was built by Hunter Marine in the United States between 1989 and 1993, but it is now out of production. The design's construction records were lost when the company went through bankruptcy and emerged as Marlow-Hunter in 2012 and the number of Hunter 43 Legends that were completed is not known.

Design
The Hunter 43 Legend is a recreational keelboat, built predominantly of fiberglass. It has a fractional sloop B&R rig, a raked stem, a walk-through reverse transom with a swimming platform and a folding ladder, an internally mounted spade-type rudder controlled by a wheel  and a fixed wing keel. It displaces  and carries  of ballast.

Operational history
In a 2017 review of the design, Sailing magazine writer David Liscio praised the interior accommodations and the sailing qualities. He noted, "During an early-fall sail aboard Sea Fever in Narragansett Bay, the boat consistently outran the other vessels in the fleet. In 25 knots of wind and large swells, the boat handled admirably ... As promised, the boat was both maneuverable and predictable, easily pointing high into the wind. Its large rudder made backing into the slip less challenging." Of the design he concluded, " Owners love these boats because they’re relatively fast, responsive to the touch, easy to handle, comfortable below deck and offer amenities typically valued by cruisers. Wheel steering, a walk-through transom with swim platform, anchor well and rollers, removable helm seat, adjustable mainsheet traveler, lines that lead back to the cockpit, and two pairs of two-speed, self-tailing winches, are usually enough to keep owners smiling."

See also
List of sailing boat types

Related development
Hunter 430

Similar sailboats
C&C 43-1
C&C 43-2
Hunter 420
Hunter 426

References

Keelboats
1980s sailboat type designs
Sailing yachts
Sailboat type designs by Hunter Design Team
Sailboat types built by Hunter Marine